Perfluorohexanoic acid (PFHxA) is a fluorinated carboxylic acid derivative of hexanoic acid. Fluoridated polymers with six carbon or less commonly degrade into perfluorohexanoic acid.

Perfluorohexanoic acid has been found to rapidly bioaccumulate.

In 2020 Michigan adopted drinking water standards for 5 previously unregulated PFAS compounds including PFHxA which has a maximum contaminant level (MCL) of 400 parts per billion (ppb).

References 

Chemistry timelines
Fluorinated carboxylic acids